Charles Frederick Courtney ( – c. 25 September 1941) was an English metallurgist, manager of the Sulphide Corporation, a mining and chemical manufacturing company in Australia.

History
Courtney was trained as a civil engineer in England, and was employed with the Fairbairn Engineering Co. (perhaps William Fairbairn & Sons)

He had also worked as engineer for the Manchester Corporation

He worked on the Tharsis Sulphur and Copper Company's works in Tharsis, Spain, for 14 years.

He was brought out from England to replace Randolph Adams as manager of Ashcroft's process at the Central Mine, Broken Hill, only recently taken over by the Sulphide Corporation. He arrived in Adelaide aboard Orizba in April 1897, and at Broken Hill in company with the Melbourne chairman J. S. Reid on 23 April. Adams had been at the Central Mine for 5 years under three different owners, and was returning to the US.
The new facility at Cockle Creek, near Newcastle, had just been brought into operation under Ashcroft's direction.

Ashcroft's process for reducing zinc ore by electrolysis was abandoned as uneconomical, and around the same time an unrelated process, magnetic separation, was introduced to improve ore yield. The company became a major producer of sulphuric acid and superphosphate.

Courtney became general manager for Australia of the Sulphide Corporation Ltd. in 1903, resident in Melbourne, with a home "Granlahan" on Toorak Road, South Yarra; James Hebbard was his successor. In September 1922 Courtney left Melbourne to take up the position of the corporation's managing director in England.
He resigned in 1940 due to ill-health and died the following year.

Inventor
Improved magnetic separator (with Robert Butterworth, also of Broken Hill) 1899

Author
Masonry Dams from Inception to Completion: Including Numerous Formulae, Forms of Specification and Tender, Pocket Diagram of Forces, Etc.; For the Use of Civil and Mining Engineers
The Extraction of Silver, Copper and Tin (Contributor) This book is available as a facsimile of the 1896 original, published by Kerby Jackson.

Family
Courtney married Marion Dorothy Tattersfield (15 July 1852 – 1 September 1932); their son Guy Courtney married Elsie May Poole on 24 June 1913.

References 

1941 deaths
English mining engineers
Australian metallurgists
Australian mine managers
Australian mining engineers
History of Broken Hill